2017 Bandy World Championship was the 37th Bandy World Championship and was held in Sweden.  The games in Division A were played in Göransson Arena in Sandviken, 29 January to 5 February.  The games of Division B were played in Slättbergshallen in Trollhättan, 24–28 January.

Participating teams

Eight nations competed in Division A. Eleven were originally scheduled to play in Division B, which would have been an all-time high of nineteen. However, Latvia did not compete  thus the record set at the 2016 tournament was matched.

Division A

Pool A

Pool B

Division B

Pool A

Pool B

Squads

Arenas

Division A

Preliminary round

Group A 

All times are local (UTC+1).

Group B

Knockout stage

Quarterfinals

7th place game

5th place game

Semifinals

Third place game

Final

Final standings

Belarus is relegated and will be playing in Division B in the 2018 Bandy World Championship.

Division B

Preliminary round

Group A

Group B 
Matches in Group B are 60 minutes in duration rather than the standard 90 minutes.

Play-off

Final standings

Canada is promoted and will be playing in Division A in the 2018 Bandy World Championship.

Broadcasting
 Russia: Match TV
 Sweden: Kanal 5, Eurosport 2

Sources

External links
Official site Division A
Official site Division B

2017
World Championship
2017 in Swedish sport
International bandy competitions hosted by Sweden
Sports competitions in Sandviken
January 2017 sports events in Europe
February 2017 sports events in Europe
Sports competitions in Trollhättan